Administrative Science Quarterly is a peer-reviewed academic journal covering the field of organizational studies. The journal was established in 1956 and is published by SAGE Publications for the Samuel Curtis Johnson Graduate School of Management at Cornell University. For 2007, it was ranked as the #16 academic journal in business by Financial Times.

Scope 
Administrative Science Quarterly publishes theoretical and empirical papers based on dissertations as well as the work of more established scholars. The interdisciplinary journal also contains work in organizational theory, and informative book reviews.

Abstracting and indexing
Administrative Science Quarterly is abstracted and indexed in, among other databases:  SCOPUS, and the Social Sciences Citation Index. According to the Journal Citation Reports, its 2019 impact factor is 8.304, ranking it 7 out of 226 journals in the category ‘Management’, and 7 out of 152 journals in the category ‘Business’.

References

External links 
 

Cornell University academic journals
Publications established in 1956
Business and management journals
Quarterly journals
English-language journals
SAGE Publishing academic journals
1956 establishments in New York (state)